

Notable stencil artists  (by country of origin)
Notable stencil artists include:

Australia
Civilian (Australia) - stencil graffiti
Meek (Australia) - stencil graffiti
Reks (Australia) - stencil graffiti, art urbain, graffiti, street poster art

Brazil 
 Alex Vallauri - stencil graffiti

Canada
Posterchild (Canada) - stencil graffiti, street poster art

Estonia
Edward von Lõngus (Estonia) - stencil graffiti

France
Blek le Rat (France) - stencil graffiti, art intervention
C215 (France) - stencil graffiti
Miss Tic (France) - stencil graffiti
Jef Aerosol (France) - stencil graffiti
Epsylon .(France) - stencil graffiti
Kim Prisu Nuklé-art (France) - stencil graffiti, art urbain
Marie Rouffet (France) - stencil graffiti
VR, Hervé Morlay (France) - stencil graffiti

Germany
van Ray (Germany) - stencil graffiti

Italy
Sten Lex (Italy) - stencil graffiti
kocore (Italy) - stencil graffiti
koi (Italy) - stencil graffiti
Lucamaleonte (Italy) - stencil graffiti
Jbrock (Italy) - stencil graffiti
Nemea (Italy) - stencil graffiti
Hogre (Italy) - stencil graffiti

Norway
 Dolk (Norway) - stencil graffiti, graffiti
 DOT DOT DOT (Norway) - stencil graffiti, graffiti
 Pøbel (Norway) - stencil graffiti, graffiti

Netherlands
Fake (Germany) - stencil graffiti, art urban
 Tinker Brothers (Netherlands)

Russia
N888K (Russia) - stencil graffiti, art urban
Zoom (Russia) - stencil, art , street poster art, art intervention

United Kingdom
Banksy (UK) - stencil graffiti, art intervention 
JPS (UK) - stencil graffiti, art, Weston-Super-Mare
909 Art (UK) - stencil graffiti, art, Kettering.

Switzerland
NEVERCREW (CH) - stencil graffiti, mural paintings, installations, art intervention

United States
Tavar Zawacki f.k.a. 'ABOVE' (United States) - stencil graffiti, art intervention, screenprinting
Faile (USA/Canada/Japan) - stencil graffiti, street poster art, screenprinting
Josh MacPhee (USA) - stencil graffiti, street poster art, screenprinting
Scott Williams (USA)
Christopher Wool (USA)

See also

Stencil artists
Graffiti artists